Mount Kelly is a mountain with an elevation of   that is the tallest peak in the Scabby Range and is situated on the border of the Australian Capital Territory and New South Wales, Australia. The summit of the mountain is located within the ACT.

The ACT portion of the mountain is located within Namadgi National Park and the NSW side within the Scabby Nature Reserve and Kosciuszko National Park. The area surrounding Mount Kelly is a wilderness area which was severely affected by the Canberra bushfires of 2003.

See also

 Australian Alps
 List of mountains in New South Wales

References

Kelly
Kelly
Borders of New South Wales
Borders of the Australian Capital Territory